Jennifer Abel (born August 23, 1991) is a Canadian former diver. She is currently partnered with Mélissa Citrini-Beaulieu for synchronized diving. She won an Olympic bronze medal at the 2012 Summer Olympics in the 3 m synchro diving event with Émilie Heymans and a silver medal at the 2020 Summer Olympics in the same event with Melissa Citrini-Beaulieu. Abel is a four-time Commonwealth Games champion in the 1 m and 3 m synchronized springboard; and is also a three-time Pan American Games champion in the 3 m springboard and 3 m synchronized springboard. Her ten medals (six silver, four bronze) at the FINA World Championships are a record for most medals by a Canadian in diving at the world championships.

Career
Abel became one of Canada's youngest ever divers when she had her debut Olympics at the age of 16 in the 2008 Summer Olympics. Though failing to win a medal at the Olympic games that year, Abel did achieve success together with partner Emilie Heymans on the Grand Prix circuit, winning several medals. Their work together would continue after that, and Abel would gain from Heymans' experience which would build through to more Grand Prix medals through to 2010.

She became the 2010 Commonwealth Games champion in both the 1 m springboard and the 3 m synchro springboard with Émilie Heymans, as well as holding a 2010 Commonwealth silver in the 3 m springboard. After her positive results she said that "This was my first Commonwealth Games and I didn't expect to win so many medals. It shows I'm on the right track for the Olympics." In 2011, Abel also achieved a bronze medal and a silver medal from the world championships in the 3 m springboard and the 3 m synchro again with Heymans. She then went on to win a silver with Heymans at the 2011 Pan American Games in the 3-metre synchro event. For the year of 2011, Abel was named the Aquatic Federation of Canada's female athlete of the year.

At the 2012 Summer Olympics, she won a bronze medal, with her partner Heymans, in the 3 m springboard synchronized diving event. On winning her first Olympic medal at the age of 20, Abel said "Since the beginning of the year we’ve been really nervous about that moment. I think it takes time to just calm down and just realize it."

Abel competed at the 2014 Commonwealth Games, she and partner Pamela Ware won the silver medal in 3 m synchro springboard. She next competed in the 1 m springboard where she won the gold medal. Abel finished with a silver medal in the 3 m single springboard event, completing a three medal games for her. At the 2016 Summer Olympics Abel finished a frustrating fourth in both the solo and synchro 3 m springboard events.

Following her disappointing results at the 2016 Olympics, Abel began competing with new partner Mélissa Citrini-Beaulieu. At the 2017 World Aquatics Championships they partnered to a silver medal together in their first year in the women's 3-metre synchro springboard event. Abel also partnered with François Imbeau-Dulac in the mixed 3-metre synchro springboard where they won bronze. Individually, Abel also won a bronze medal at these Championships, diving to bronze medal in the 3-metre springboard. With these three medals Abel tied Alexandre Despatie for the most medals by a Canadian at the FINA World Championships.  At the 2018 Commonwealth Games, Abel won the women's 3 m springboard event.

She qualified to represent Canada at the 2020 Summer Olympics. In Tokyo, Abel and partner  Melissa Citrini-Beaulieu were silver medalists in the 3 m springboard event.

Abel officially announced her retirement after the Tokyo Olympics.

Personal life
Abel is of Haitian descent. She is in a relationship with David Lemieux, former IBF middleweight boxing champion. Lemieux proposed to Abel on her return from the 2021 Summer Olympics and they are now engaged.

See also
List of Canadian sports personalities

References

External links

 
 
 
 
 Diving Plongeon Canada 
 

1991 births
Living people
Sportspeople from Laval, Quebec
Divers from Montreal
Canadian female divers
Black Canadian sportswomen
World Aquatics Championships medalists in diving
Olympic divers of Canada
Olympic medalists in diving
Olympic silver medalists for Canada
Olympic bronze medalists for Canada
Divers at the 2008 Summer Olympics
Divers at the 2012 Summer Olympics
Divers at the 2016 Summer Olympics
Divers at the 2020 Summer Olympics
Medalists at the 2012 Summer Olympics
Medalists at the 2020 Summer Olympics
Commonwealth Games medallists in diving
Commonwealth Games gold medallists for Canada
Commonwealth Games silver medallists for Canada
Commonwealth Games bronze medallists for Canada
Divers at the 2010 Commonwealth Games
Divers at the 2014 Commonwealth Games
Divers at the 2018 Commonwealth Games
Pan American Games medalists in diving
Pan American Games gold medalists for Canada
Pan American Games silver medalists for Canada
Divers at the 2011 Pan American Games
Divers at the 2015 Pan American Games
Medalists at the 2011 Pan American Games
Medalists at the 2015 Pan American Games
Francophone Quebec people
Haitian Quebecers
Canadian sportspeople of Haitian descent
Medallists at the 2010 Commonwealth Games
Medallists at the 2014 Commonwealth Games
Medallists at the 2018 Commonwealth Games